Gary Ben Clark (born 9 April 1971) is an English professional golfer.

Clark was born in London. He attended the University of Arkansas before turning professional in 1995. He qualified for the European Tour through qualifying school at the end of that year.

Clark finished in 103rd place on the Order of Merit in his début season. Since losing his playing privileges the following year, he has played predominantly on Europe's second tier Challenge Tour, where he has a best of 5th place on the end of season rankings in 2001. That enabled him to graduate back to the European Tour for the following season. He has also come through qualifying school twice, in 2005 and 2008, to regain his place at the top level, but has not been able to maintain his card although he was granted a medical exemption for the 2010 season.

Clark recorded his maiden professional win in 2008 at the DHL Wroclaw Open on the Challenge Tour.

Professional wins (1)

Challenge Tour wins (1)

Challenge Tour playoff record (0–1)

Results in major championships

Note: Clark only played in The Open Championship.

CUT = missed the half-way cut
"T" = tied

See also
2005 European Tour Qualifying School graduates
2008 European Tour Qualifying School graduates

References

External links

English male golfers
European Tour golfers
Arkansas Razorbacks men's golfers
Golfers from London
People from Rickmansworth
1971 births
Living people